Mamontovo is a rural locality (a station) in Tishinsky Selsoviet, Rubtsovsky District, Altai Krai, Russia. The population was 437 as of 2013. There are 6 streets.

Geography 
It is located 9 km south-east from Tishinka.

References 

Rural localities in Rubtsovsky District